Lymphatic vessel endothelial hyaluronan receptor 1 (LYVE1), also known as extracellular link domain containing 1 (XLKD1) is a Link domain-containing hyaladherin, a protein capable of binding to hyaluronic acid (HA), homologous to CD44, the main HA receptor. In humans it is encoded by the LYVE1 gene.

LYVE1 is a type I integral membrane glycoprotein. It acts as a receptor and binds to both soluble and immobilized hyaluronan. This protein may function in lymphatic hyaluronan transport and have a role in tumor metastasis. LYVE-1 is a cell surface receptor on lymphatic endothelial cells that can be used as a lymphatic endothelial cell marker, allowing for the isolation of these cells for experimental purposes. The physiological role for this receptor is still the subject of debate, but evolutionary conservation suggests an important role.

Expression of LYVE1 not restricted to lymph vessels but is also observed in normal liver blood sinusoids, and  embryonic blood vessels. 

LYVE1 expression is also observed in subset of macrophages.  LYVE1 positive macrophages in the meninges of rats are both lymphatic, as well as, alymphatic. In brain dura, the LYVE1+ macrophages were predominantly pleomorphic in morphology, while the cells in the spinal cord were pleomorphic in the cervical dura, while in the thoracal dura the cells were mainly round in morphology. The cells in brain dura were associated with collagen network in meninges, and some nonlymphatic LYVE1+ macrophages contained intracellular collagen. The exact function of these cells is yet unknown.

References

Further reading 

 
 
 
 
 
 
 
 
 
 
 
 

Glycoproteins